Manfred Gombasch (born 7 January 1952) is an Austrian footballer. He played in four matches for the Austria national football team from 1973 to 1975.

References

External links
 

1952 births
Living people
Austrian footballers
Austria international footballers
Place of birth missing (living people)
Association footballers not categorized by position